A candidate, or nominee, is the prospective recipient of an award or honor, or a person seeking or being considered for some kind of position; for example:
 to be elected to an office — in this case a candidate selection procedure occurs.
 to receive membership in a  group

"Nomination" is part of the process of selecting a candidate for either election to an office by a political party, or the bestowing of an honor or award. This person is called a "nominee", though nominee often is used interchangeably with "candidate". A presumptive nominee is a person or organization believes that the nomination is inevitable or likely. The act of being a candidate in a race for either a party nomination or for electoral office is called a "candidacy". Presumptive candidate may be used to describe someone who is predicted to be a formal candidate.

Etymology
Candidate is a derivative of the Latin  (‘shining white’). In Ancient Rome, people running for political office would usually wear togas chalked and bleached to be bright white at speeches, debates, conventions, and other public functions.

Candidates for church membership
Individuals who wish to be received into the membership of the Catholic Church who have been baptized in another mainstream Christian denomination are known as candidates and their reception into the Catholic Church is done through a profession of faith, followed by the reception of Holy Communion and Confirmation. In contrast, those persons who have never received the sacrament of baptism are canonically considered non-Christians and if they are preparing to become a member of the Catholic Church, they are known as catechumens.

Candidates in elections

In the context of elections for public office in a representational partisan democracy, a candidate who has been selected by a political party is normally said to be the nominee of that party.  The party's selection (that is, the nomination) is typically accomplished either based on one or more primary elections according to the rules of the party and any applicable election laws.

Candidates are called "incumbents" if they are already serving in the office for which they are seeking re-election, or "challengers", if they are seeking to replace an incumbent.

In the context of elections for public office in a direct democracy, a candidate can be nominated by any eligible person—and if parliamentary procedures are used, the nomination has to be seconded, i.e., receive agreement from a second person.

In some non-partisan representative systems (e.g., administrative elections of the Baháʼí Faith), no nominations (or campaigning, electioneering, etc.) take place at all, with voters free to choose any person at the time of voting—with some possible exceptions such as through a minimum age requirement—in the jurisdiction. In such cases, it is not required (or even possible) that the members of the electorate be familiar with all of the eligible persons in their area, though such systems may involve indirect elections at larger geographic levels to ensure that some first-hand familiarity among potential electees can exist at these levels (i.e., among the elected delegates).

Spitzenkandidat

In German politics, the person at the head of an electoral list is called the Spitzenkandidat ("lead candidate"). By convention, this means that this person (normally the party leader) will be elected to lead the government if their party wins the election. Various other countries with a parliamentary democracy have the same system.

In 2014, the major groups represented in the European Parliament and the European Council agreed to apply this process to determine the next President of the European Commission, as a way of the Council "taking account of the results of the European Parliament election" as required by the Union treaties. This led to the appointment and confirmation of Jean-Claude Juncker.

Presumptive candidate
The term "presumptive candidate" or "prospective candidate" is sometimes used to describe a person who has not officially become a candidate but is considered very likely to in the future.

See also

 Age of candidacy
 Paper candidate
 Parachute candidate
 Perennial candidate
 Star candidate
 Write-in candidate

References

Elections